Presidential elections were held in Iceland on 29 June 1980. The result was a victory for Vigdís Finnbogadóttir, who received 33.8% of the vote. She became the world's first democratically elected female President.

Results

References

Presidential election
Presidential elections in Iceland
Iceland
Iceland